Staroabzanovo (İśke Abzan) is a rural locality (a selo) in Kucherbayevsky Selsoviet, Blagovarsky District, Bashkortostan, Russia. The population was 319 as of 2010. There are 4 streets.

Geography 
Staroabzanovo is located 37 km northwest of Yazykovo (the district's administrative centre) by road. Starokucherbayevo is the nearest rural locality.

References 

Rural localities in Blagovarsky District